The Oman butterflyfish (Chaetodon dialeucos) is a species of marine ray-finned fish, a butterflyfish belonging to the family Chaetodontidae. It is native to the northwestern Indian Ocean.

Description
The Oman butterflyfish is a rather drab butterflyfish which has a greyish coloured body with the margins of the scales being dark brown. There is a broad, vertical white bar to the rear of the head and the mouth is white. The caudal fin is black which is slightly rounded. The dorsal fin contains 12 spines and 21-22 soft rays while the anal fin has 3 spines and 19 soft rays. Juveniles have a sharply defined white stripe to the rear of the eye and a white caudal fin.

Distribution
The Oman butterflyfish is found in the northwestern Indian Ocean in the Arabian Sea along the southern coast of the Arabian Peninsula in Yemen and Oman.

Habitat and biology
Its diet is made up is coral polyps, sea anemones, worms, crustaceans, and algae. It is an oviparous species which forms pairs for spawning.

Systematics
The Oman butterflyfish was first formally described in 1989 by Rodney V. Salm and Kevin Mee with the type locality given as southwest of Barr al Hikman in the Sultanate of Oman. Some authorities place this species within the large subgenus Rabdophorus but others consider it to be incertae sedis.

References

Fish described in 1989
Chaetodon